The Roosevelt family is an American political family from New York whose members have included two United States presidents, a First Lady, and various merchants, bankers, politicians, inventors, clergymen, artists, and socialites. The progeny of a mid-17th century Dutch immigrant to New Amsterdam, many members of the family became nationally prominent in New York City politics and business and intermarried with prominent colonial families. Two distantly related branches of the family from Oyster Bay and Hyde Park, New York, rose to global political prominence with the presidencies of Theodore Roosevelt (1901–1909) and his fifth cousin Franklin D. Roosevelt (1933–1945), whose wife, First Lady Eleanor Roosevelt, was Theodore's niece. The Roosevelt family is one of four families to have produced two presidents of the United States by the same surname; the others were the Adams, Bush, and Harrison families.

History

Claes Maartenszen van Rosenvelt (c. 1626 – 1659), the immigrant ancestor of the Roosevelt family, arrived in New Amsterdam (present-day New York City) sometime between 1638 and 1649. About the year 1652, he bought a farm from Lambert van Valckenburgh, comprising 24 morgens (i.e., 20.44 ha or 50.51 acres) in what is now Midtown Manhattan, including the present site of the Empire State Building. The property included approximately what is now the area between Lexington Avenue and Fifth Avenue bounded by 29th St. and 35th St.

Claes' son Nicholas was the first to use the spelling Roosevelt and the first to hold political office, as an alderman. Nicholas' children Johannes and Jacobus were, respectively, the progenitors of the Oyster Bay and Hyde Park branches of the family.  By the late 19th century, the Hyde Park Roosevelts were generally associated with the Democratic Party and the Oyster Bay Roosevelts with the Republican Party. President Theodore Roosevelt, an Oyster Bay Roosevelt, was the uncle of Eleanor Roosevelt, later wife of Franklin Roosevelt. Despite political differences that caused family members to actively campaign against each other, the two branches generally remained friendly.

Coats of arms

In heraldry, canting arms are a visual or pictorial depiction of a surname, and were and still are a popular practice.  It would be common to find roses, then, in the arms of many Roosevelt families, even unrelated ones (the name Rosenvelt means "rose field").  Also, grassy mounds or fields of green would be a familiar attribute.

The Van Roosevelts of Oud-Vossemeer in Zeeland have a coat of arms that is divided horizontally, the top portion with a white chevron between three white roses, while the bottom half is gold with a red lion rampant.  A traditional blazon suggested would be, Per fess vert a chevron between three roses argent and Or a lion rampant gules.

The coat of arms of the namesakes of the Dutch immigrant Claes van Rosenvelt, ancestor of the American political family that included Theodore and Franklin D. Roosevelt, were white with a rosebush with three rose flowers growing upon a grassy mound, and whose crest was of three ostrich feathers divided into red and white halves each.  In heraldic terms this would be described as, Argent upon a grassy mound a rose bush proper bearing three roses gules barbed and seeded all proper, with a crest upon a torse argent and gules of Three ostrich plumes each per pale gules and argent.  Franklin Roosevelt altered his arms to omit the rosebush and use in its place three crossed roses on their stems, changing the blazon of his shield to Three roses one in pale and two in saltire gules barbed seeded slipped and left proper.

Members

  Claes Martenszen van Rosenvelt (1623–1660), m. Jannetje Samuels Thomas (1625–1660)
 Elsie Roosevelt (bap. 1652–1703), m. Hendrick Meyer, New York City assistant alderman
 Catharina Meyer, m. Harmanus Rutgers
 Hendrick Rutgers (1712–1779), m. Catharina De Peyster, daughter of Mayor of New York City Johannes de Peyster
 Henry Rutgers (1745–1830), Revolutionary War hero, philanthropist, namesake of Rutgers University
 Eva Rutgers, m. John Provoost
 Samuel Provoost (1742–1815), Bishop of the Episcopal Church
 Maria Provoost, m. Cadwallader D. Colden, Mayor of New York City
 Anna Margaret Roosevelt (1654–1706), m. Heyman A. Roosa (1643–1708)
 Nicholas Roosevelt (1658–1742), m. Heyltje Jans Kunst (1664–1730)
 Nicholas Roosevelt (b. 1687), goldsmith
  Nicholas Roosevelt (b. 1715), first lieutenant of the Hearts of Oak militia in the American Revolutionary War
  Nicholas Roosevelt (1758–1838), member of the New York Assembly from Warren County
  Solomon Roosevelt (1778–1832)
  Solomon Roosevelt (1807–1900), shipbuilder, built many steamships under the firm Roosevelt & Joyce, including the USS Morse.  See Allaire Iron Works.
  George Washington Roosevelt (1844–1907), Medal of Honor recipient for action at Bull Run, diplomat
 Johannes Roosevelt (1689–1750)
 Margreta Roosevelt (bap. 1709), m. William de Peyster, son of Mayor of New York City Johannes de Peyster
 Nicholas Roosevelt (b. 1717), merchant
  Nicholas Roosevelt (bap. 1740), New York City alderman
 Cornelius Roosevelt (b. 1731), chocolate maker, New York City alderman
 Cornelius C. Roosevelt (bap. 1755), merchant, New York City alderman, member of the New York State Assembly, m. Alida Fargie, granddaughter of Albany and New York City mayor Edward Holland
 Maria Roosevelt (1760–1821), m. John Duffie
 Matilda Duffie, m. Gerard De Peyster, New York City alderman
 Margaret De Peyster, m. Philip Milledoler Brett, President of Rutgers University
 Cornelius Roosevelt Duffie (1789–1827), Episcopal priest, founder and rector of Saint Thomas Church, m. Helena Bleecker, granddaughter of Anthony Lispenard Bleecker
 Cornelius Roosevelt Duffie (1821–1900), first chaplain of Columbia College, founder and first rector of the Church of St. John the Baptist
  Elbert Roosevelt (1767–1857), New York City merchant, early settler of Pelham Manor, New York, m. Jane Curtenius, daughter of merchant and politician Peter T. Curtenius
  Clinton Roosevelt (1804–1898), politician and inventor
  Jacobus Roosevelt (1724–1777)
 Johannes Roosevelt (bap. 1751), m. Mary Schuyler of the Schuyler, Van Rensselaer, and Van Cortlandt families.
 Mary Roosevelt (1789–1837), m. William Sheriff de Peyster, son of Pierre Guillaume de Peyster (himself a brother of Arent de Peyster)
 Nicholas Roosevelt (1767–1854), inventor, m. Lydia Latrobe, daughter of architect Benjamin Henry Latrobe
  Samuel Roosevelt (1813–1878)
 Nicholas Latrobe Roosevelt (1847–1892)
  Henry Latrobe Roosevelt (1879–1936), Assistant Secretary of the U.S. Navy, m. Eleanor Morrow, daughter of California judge and U.S. Representative William W. Morrow
 Eleanor Katherine Roosevelt (1915–1995), m. Reverdy Wadsworth, son of U.S. Senator and Representative James W. Wadsworth Jr.
  Samuel Montgomery Roosevelt (1858–1920), artist
  James Jacobus Roosevelt (1759–1840), m. Maria Van Schaack (a descendant of the Schuyler family).
 Cornelius Van Schaack Roosevelt Sr. (1794–1871), progenitor of the Oyster Bay Roosevelts (see below)
 James John Roosevelt (1795–1875), politician, businessman and jurist, m. Cornelia Van Ness, daughter of Vermont politician Cornelius P. Van Ness
 Marcia Ouseley Roosevelt (b. 1847), m. Edward Brooks Scovel, opera singer
 Frederick Roosevelt Scovel, m. Vivien May Sartoris (1879–1933), daughter of Nellie Grant and granddaughter of President Ulysses S. Grant
 Catherine Roosevelt (1803–1844), m. Michael Bourke
 Margaret Jones Bourke, m. Thomas Edward Kenny, Canadian merchant, banker, and politician
 William Henry Roosevelt (1806–1869), politician, land speculator (Illinois)
  James Jacobus Roosevelt (1692–1776), m. Catharina Hardenbroek
 Helena Roosevelt (1719–1772), m. Andrew Barclay, namesake of Barclay Street in Manhattan
 Charlotte Amelia Barclay (1760–1778), m. Richard Bayley, first professor of anatomy at Columbia College
 Guy Carlton Bayley, m. Grace Roosevelt (see below)
 James Roosevelt Bayley (1814–1877), Bishop of Newark and Archbishop of Baltimore
 Christopher Roosevelt (b. 1739)
  James Christopher Roosevelt (1770)
  James Henry Roosevelt (1800–1863), founder of the Roosevelt Hospital
  Isaac Roosevelt (1726–1794), merchant, co-founder of the Bank of New York, Federalist politician, served in the New York State Assembly and the New York Constitutional Convention, m. Cornelia Hoffman
 Jacobus Roosevelt (1760–1847), m. Maria Walton, a descendant of Wilhelmus Beekman
 Grace Roosevelt, m. Guy Carlton Bayley (see above)
 Isaac Daniel Roosevelt (1790–1863), progenitor of the Hyde Park Roosevelts, m. Mary Rebecca Aspinwall
  Maria Roosevelt (b. 1763), m. Richard Varick, Mayor of New York City

Oyster Bay Roosevelts

 Cornelius Van Schaack Roosevelt Sr. (1794–1871), co-founder of Chemical Bank
 Silas Weir Roosevelt (1823–1870)
 Cornelius Roosevelt (1847–1902), m. Anais Julia Carmencita Piorkque (1848–1941), m. Anastacia Anderpoll (1879–1962)
 Andre Roosevelt (1879–1962), film director, m. Adelheid Lange (1879–1962), sculptress
  Hilda Roosevelt (1881–1965), Parisian opera singer
 Hilborne Roosevelt, (1849–1886), pioneering organ builder, m. Katherine Shippen
  James West Roosevelt, (1858–1896), physician
  Nicholas Roosevelt (1893–1982), American diplomat and journalist
 James Alfred Roosevelt (1825–1898), banker
 Alfred Roosevelt (1856–1891), banker, m. Katherine Lowell, daughter of Massachusetts businessman and industrialist Augustus Lowell
  Elfrida Roosevelt, m. Sir Orme Bigland Clarke, 4th Baronet, military officer
  Sir Humphrey Clarke, 5th Baronet (1906–1973)
  Sir Toby Clarke, 6th Baronet (1939–2019), British businessman
  Theodora Roosevelt Clarke (1985–), United Kingdom parliamentarian
  Sir Lawrence Clarke, 7th Baronet (1990–), Olympic hurdler and investment banker
  William Emlen Roosevelt (1857–1930), banker and telegraph executive
 George Emlen Roosevelt (1887–1963), banker and philanthropist  Julian Roosevelt (1924–1986), Olympic gold medalist and IOC member
  Philip James Roosevelt Sr. (1892–1941), U.S. Army captain during World War I and banker, m. his second cousin Jean S. Roosevelt (see below)
 Cornelius Van Schaack Roosevelt Jr.
 Robert Barnwell Roosevelt (1829–1906), conservationist, m. 1st Elizabeth Ellis, m. 2nd Minnie O'Shea
 John Ellis Roosevelt (1853–1939), m. Nannie Vance, daughter of New York City politician Samuel B. H. Vance
 Jean Schermerhorn Roosevelt, m. her second cousin Philip James Roosevelt Sr. (see above)
  Granville Roland Fortescue (1875–1952), soldier and war correspondent, m. Grace Hubbard Bell, niece of Alexander Graham Bell
 Thalia Massie (1911–1963), whose rape was the subject of the 1932 Massie Trial
 Helene Whitney (1914–1990) (born Kenyon Fortescue), 1930s and 1940s film actress, m. Julian Louis Reynolds, son of Richard S. Reynolds Sr. and heir to the Reynolds tobacco and aluminum fortunes
 Theodore Roosevelt Sr. (1831–1878), m. Martha "Mittie" Bulloch
 Anna "Bamie/Bye" Roosevelt (1855–1931), m. William Sheffield Cowles Sr.
 William Sheffield Cowles Jr. (1898—1986), Connecticut State Representative, Mayor of Farmington, Connecticut
 Theodore "T.R." Roosevelt Jr. (1858–1919), 1st m. Alice Hathaway Lee, 2nd m. Edith Kermit Carow, 5th Assistant Secretary of the Navy, 33rd Governor of New York, 25th Vice President of the United States, and 26th President of the United States
 Alice Lee Roosevelt (1884–1980), m. Nicholas Longworth IV
 Paulina Longworth (1925–1957) (daughter with William Edgar Borah), m. Alexander McCormick Sturm
 Joanna Mercedes Alessandra Sturm (b. 1946)
 Theodore "Ted" Roosevelt III (1887–1944), m. Eleanor Butler Alexander
 Grace Green Roosevelt (1911–1994), m. William McMillan
 Theodore Roosevelt IV (1914–2001), m. Anne Mason Babcock
 Theodore Roosevelt V (b. 1942), m. Constance Lane Rogers
 Theodore Roosevelt VI (b. 1976), m. Serena Clare Torrey
 Cornelius Van Schaack Roosevelt III (1915–1991)
 Quentin Roosevelt II (1919–1948), m. Frances Blanche Webb
 Anna C. Roosevelt (b. 1946), archaeologist
 Susan Roosevelt, m. William Weld
  Alexandra Roosevelt 
 Kermit Roosevelt Sr. (1889–1943), m. Belle Wyatt Willard
 Kermit Roosevelt Jr. (changed to Sr. on father's death) (1916–2000), m. Mary Lowe Gaddis
 Kermit Roosevelt III (changed to Jr. on grandfather's death)
  Kermit Roosevelt IV (b. 1971, changed to III on great-grandfather's death), law professor and writer
  Mark Roosevelt (b. 1955), President of St. John's College
 Joseph Willard Roosevelt (1918–2008), pianist and composer
 Belle Wyatt "Clochette" Roosevelt (1920–1985), m. John Gorham Palfrey Jr., great-grandson of Massachusetts congressman John G. Palfrey
 John Gorham Palfrey III (b. 1945), m. Judith Sullivan
 John Palfrey (b. 1972), law professor and Head of School at Phillips Academy
  Quentin Palfrey (b. 1974)
 Ethel Carow Roosevelt (1891–1977), m. Richard Derby
 Edith Roosevelt Derby (1917–2008), historian and conservationist
 Sarah Alden Derby (1920–1999), m. Vermont State Senator Robert T. Gannett
 Archibald Bulloch "Archie" Roosevelt Sr. (1894–1979), m. Grace Lockwood, municipal bond broker
 Archibald Bulloch Roosevelt Jr. (1918–1990), CIA officer, 1st m. Katherine Tweed, 2nd m. Selwa Carmen Showker
  Tweed Roosevelt (b. 1942), businessman
 Theodora Roosevelt (1919–2008), novelist, m. Tom Keogh
 Nancy Dabney Roosevelt (1923–2010), m. William Eldred Jackson, son of jurist Robert H. Jackson
 Melissa Jackson (b. 1952), jurist and lawyer
 Melanie Jackson, literary agent, m. Thomas Pynchon
  Edith Kermit Roosevelt (1926–2003), newspaper columnist, m. Alexander Gregory Barmine
  Margot Roosevelt (b. 1950), journalist, m. Ralph Hornblower III
 Samuel Roosevelt Hornblower (b. 1978), Emmy Award winning producer of 60 Minutes
  Quentin Roosevelt I (1897–1918)
 Elliott Roosevelt (socialite) (1860–1894), m. Anna Rebecca Hall, a descendant of the Livingston family
 Anna Eleanor Roosevelt (1884–1962), First Lady of the United States, delegate to the United Nations, m. Franklin Delano Roosevelt Sr.
 Elliott Roosevelt Jr. (1889–1893)
 Gracie Hall Roosevelt (1891–1941), 1st m. Margaret Richardson, 2nd m. Dorothy Kemp
 Corinne Roosevelt (1861–1933), m. Douglas Robinson, poet, lecturer, and orator
 Theodore Douglas Robinson (1883–1934) m. Helen Rebecca Roosevelt
 Douglas Robinson (1906–1964), m. Louise Miller, daughter of New York Governor Nathan L. Miller
 Elizabeth Mary Douglas Robinson (1909–1979), m. Jacques Blaise de Sibour, son of architect Jules Henri de Sibour
 Corinne Douglas Robinson (1886–1971), twice elected to the Connecticut House of Representatives, m. Joseph Wright Alsop IV
 Joseph Wright Alsop V (1910–1989), journalist and syndicated newspaper columnist
 Corinne Roosevelt Alsop (1912–1997), m. Percy Chubb II, grandson of the founder of Chubb Limited
 Stewart Johonnot Oliver Alsop Sr. (1914–1974), American newspaper columnist and political analyst
 Joseph Wright Alsop VI, software executive and venture capitalist
 Ian Alsop
 Elizabeth Winthrop Alsop (b. 1948), children's book author,
 Stewart Johonnot Oliver Alsop Jr. (b. 1952), investor and pundit
 Richard Nicholas Alsop, missionary with FamilyLife
 Andrew Alsop
 John deKoven Alsop (1915–2000), insurance executive and Connecticut state legislator
 Monroe Douglas Robinson (1887–1944)
 Stewart Douglas Robinson (1889–1909), committed suicide by jumping from his college dormitory window after a party.

Hyde Park Roosevelts

 Isaac Daniel Roosevelt (1790–1863) m. Mary Rebecca Aspinwall
 James Roosevelt (1828–1900), 1st m. Rebecca Howland, 2nd m. Sara Ann Delano
 James Roosevelt "Rosey" Roosevelt (1854–1927) m. Helen Schermerhorn Astor
 Helen Rebecca Roosevelt (1881–1962), m. Theodore Douglas Robinson (see above)
  James Roosevelt "Tadd" Roosevelt Jr. (1879–1958)
 Franklin Delano Roosevelt (1882–1945), m. Anna Eleanor Roosevelt, 12th Assistant Secretary of the Navy, 44th Governor of New York and 32nd President of the United States
 Anna Eleanor Roosevelt (1906–1975), m. 1st Curtis Bean Dall, m. 2nd Clarence John Boettiger, m. 3rd Dr. James Addison Halsted
 Anna Eleanor Roosevelt Dall (b. 1927) m. Van H. Seagraves 1948
 Nicholas Delano Seagraves (b. 1949)
 David Delano Seagraves (b. 1952)
  Anna Eleanor Seagraves (b. 1955)
 Curtis Roosevelt Dall (1930–2016)
  John Roosevelt Boettiger (b. 1939), m. Leigh McCullough
 James Roosevelt II (1907–1991), m. 1st Betsy Cushing, m. 2nd Romelle Schneider, m. 3rd Irene Owens, m. 4th Mary Winskill
 Sara Delano Roosevelt, (1932–2021), m. pianist Anthony di Bonaventura
 Kate Roosevelt (1936–2002), m. journalist and politician William Haddad
 James Roosevelt III (b. 1945), attorney and Democratic Party official, m. Ann Martha Conlon
 Kathleen Ann Roosevelt (b. 1978), m. Jeffrey Walker
 Theresa Marie Roosevelt (b. 1982), m. Robert O'Loughlin
  Maura Amy Roosevelt (b. 1984), m. Joshua Fisher
 Michael Anthony Roosevelt (b. 1946)
 Anna Eleanor Roosevelt (b. 1948)
 Hall Delano Roosevelt (b. 1959), served on the Long Beach, California City Council in the 1990s
 Rebecca Mary Roosevelt (b. 1971)
 Franklin Roosevelt (1908–1909), died in infancy
 Elliott Roosevelt Sr. (1910–1990), United States Army Air Forces officer and author, m. 1st Emily Browning Donner, daughter of businessman William Donner, m. 2nd Ruth Josephine Googins, m. 3rd Faye Margaret Emerson, m. 4th Minnewa Bell, m. 5th Patricia Peabody
 William Donner Roosevelt (1931–2003), investment banker and philanthropist
 Ruth Chandler Roosevelt (1934–2018)
 Elliott Roosevelt Jr. (b. 1936), Texas oilman
 David Boynton Roosevelt (b. 1942)
 Livingston Delano Roosevelt (b. 1962, died as infant)
 Franklin Delano Roosevelt Jr., lawyer, politician, and businessman (1914–1988), m. 1st Ethel du Pont, m. 2nd Suzanne Perrin, m. 3rd Felicia Schiff Warburg Sarnoff, m. 4th Patricia Luisa Oakes, m. 5th Linda McKay Stevenson Weicker
 Franklin Delano Roosevelt III (b. 1938), economist, m. Grace R. Goodyear, great-granddaughter of businessman Charles W. Goodyear and granddaughter of Presbyterian minister Norman Thomas
 Phoebe Louisa Roosevelt (b. 1965)
 Nicholas Martin Roosevelt (b. 1966) (twin)
  Amelia Roosevelt (b. 1966) (twin), concert violinist
 Christopher du Pont Roosevelt (b. 1941) m. Rosalind Havemeyer, a great-granddaughter of sugar refiner Henry Osborne Havemeyer
 John A. Roosevelt
 Nancy Roosevelt Ireland
 Laura Delano Roosevelt, m. Charles Henry Silberstein
  John Aspinwall Roosevelt II (1916–1981), m. Anne Lindsay Clark
 Haven Clark Roosevelt (b. 1940)
 Anne Sturgis Roosevelt (b. 1942)
 Sara Delano Roosevelt (1946–1960); killed in a horseback-riding accident
  Joan Lindsay Roosevelt (1952–1997)
  John Aspinwall Roosevelt (1840–1909), m. Ellen Murray Crosby
 Grace Walton Roosevelt (1867–1945), tennis player, m. Appleton LeSure Clark
 Roosevelt Clark (1897–1928)
 Russell Clark (1900–1967)
 Ellen Crosby Roosevelt (1868–1954), tennis champion

See also
 Roosevelt & Son
 The Roosevelts: An Intimate History'' – 2014 television documentary miniseries

References

Further reading

External links
 Booknotes interview with Peter Collier on The Roosevelts: An American Saga, August 7, 1994.
 Booknotes interview with Betty Boyd Caroli on The Roosevelt Women, May 9, 1999.
 Booknotes interview with Susan Dunn on The Three Roosevelts: Patrician Leaders Who Transformed America, May 6, 2001.

 
American families of Dutch ancestry
American families of English ancestry
American families of Scottish ancestry
Eleanor Roosevelt
First Families of the United States
Franklin D. Roosevelt
Lists of people by surname
Theodore Roosevelt
17th-century Dutch emigrants to North America